Terellia gynaecochroma is a species of tephritid or fruit flies in the genus Terellia of the family Tephritidae.

Distribution
Central & Southern Europe, East to the Caucasus, South to Cyprus, Israel & Iran.

References

Tephritinae
Insects described in 1937
Diptera of Europe
Diptera of Asia